"Turn Up the Speakers" is a song written, produced and performed by Dutch DJs and record producers Afrojack and Martin Garrix. It was released as a digital download on 25 August 2014 on Beatport and on 22 September 2014 on iTunes, and marks the first and only collaborative work between the two artists. The track has charted in Austria, Belgium and the Netherlands.

Music video
A music video to accompany the release of "Turn Up the Speakers" was first released onto YouTube on 25 August 2014 at a total length of three minutes and nine seconds. The music video was uploaded by Spinnin' Records Youtube channel.

Chart performance

Release history

References

2014 singles
Martin Garrix songs
Afrojack songs
2014 songs
Spinnin' Records singles
Songs written by Afrojack
Songs written by Martin Garrix